The Hustler Fund, also known as The Financial Inclusion Fund, is a loan project led by the Kenyan government which provides instant loans to Kenyan citizens upon request. The program was launched by President William Ruto in late 2022 with the intention of providing at least $410 million in loans.

History

Conception 
The Hustler Fund was a campaign promise made by William Ruto during Kenya's 2022 presidential election. Ruto had run on a platform dedicated to creating a "new economic order" and the Hustler Fund was a key aspect of this platform. A majority of Kenyan citizens are in a state of perpetual debt as a result of the widespread nature of digital loans, which Kenyans often use to pay for everyday purchases. Those loans often carry high interest rates, making it impossible for average citizens to pay them off.

Launch and aftermath 
The fund was launched on November 30, 2022. It was announced that the fund would have access to a funding pool of 50 billion shillings (roughly $409 million USD) a year over at least five years and would provide individual loans of up to 50,000 shillings. Loans were restricted to four types: personal finance, micro loans, small and medium enterprise loans, and start-up loans. Borrowers are charged a flat interest rate of 8% a year. Shortly after launch, the Fund was revealed to be in violation of Kenyan data privacy laws as the Fund's privacy policy was not written in language understandable by lay people.

By January 2, 2023, the fund had loaned over 20 billion shillings. The same day, Ruto announced that the government was working on a "second phase" of the program that would increase the total amount of funding available and would target areas of the economy with higher potential for growth.

Reception 
Semafor criticized the Fund's rollout, writing that "the amount available isn't enough to really kick-start a business. And if the money doesn't generate returns, it's hard to see how Kenyans will be able to repay the loans." Some citizens criticized the program for not providing them enough money: for example, a fruit seller in Nairobi applied for a loan but only received 500 shillings (roughly $4 USD). Some critics wondered if Ruto had over-promised, however Ruto himself defended the fund and said it would be continually developed and refined.

References

External links 

 Official website

2022 establishments in Kenya
Loans